Tape, also known as Maragus, is a nearly extinct Southern Oceanic language of Vanuatu. The population of speakers of the Tape language is reduced to approximately 15 speakers who are among the older generations. The language is part of the Malayo-Polynesian subgroup of the Austronesian Language family.

The Vanuatu Islands are not the original location of where the Tape language was spoken in the past. The original location was located in an area in Malakula, including the coast from Anuatakh to Lowinsinwei, the area between the Lowisinwei River valley, the eastern bank of the Brenwei River, and a mountain in the south known as Pwitarvere. Since part of the Tape territory was close to the ocean, it allowed the people living in the area to harvest salt which was used to trade with the Tirakh people. However, the Tape people mostly lived their lives "towards the bush," meaning their lives were more oriented towards the land even though they had access to the ocean. This is shown in their language because although they lived along the coast, their descendants were not very knowledgable or could not come up with a significant amount of terms related to the sea.

Originally, there was no distinct name for the Tape language. Tape was the name of the area that the speakers lived on while in the past the language was referred to as vengesien Tape, meaning 'the language of Tape'. Over time however, people have come to use and recognize the name of the language to be "Tape". This language also has a few alternative names known as Marakus, Maragus, Maragaus, and Maraakhus, which were used by the speakers of the Naman language who were living in the Litzlitz area. The name has two roots, mar (person of (place)) and aakhus (bush) and when they are put together, the name's literal translation is 'person of the bush'.

Phonology

Vowels 

In the Tape language, there are a total of six vowels /a, e, i, o, u, and ə./ Although schwa (/ə/) is part of the list, there is a lot of debate on the role schwa plays in the language.

Comparing the use of /i/ and /e/

 /ičičər/ means '(s)he swept'
 /ičečər/ means '(s)he slipped'
 /čənin/ means 'his/her intestines
 /čənen/ means 'because of it'

Comparing the use of /e/ and /a/

 /niet/ means 'sago'
 /niar/ means 'casuarina'
 /ipel/ means '(s)he choked'
 /ipar/ means '(s)he is blind'

Comparing the use of /a/ and /o/

 /maren/ means 'tomorrow'
 /mornen/ means 'his/her left hand'
 /iɣaɣas/ means it is cold'
 /iɣos/ means 'too much'

Comparing the use of /o/ and /u/

 /ilo/ means '(s)he planted'
 /ilu/ means '(s)he fired shots'
 /nio/ means 'armband'
 /niu/ means 'dew'

Letter exceptions

The letter /i/ 
When the letter /i/ comes before the velar fricative /ɣ/ it becomes a high vowel.

Examples

 /liɣnana/ is pronounced [lɨyanan] meaning 'his/her face'
 pəliliɣ/ is pronounced [pəlilɨx] meaning 'wild kava'
 /tiɣ/ is pronounced [tɨx] meaning 'grave'

When the letter /i/ is the first letter and comes before the velar fricative /ɣ/, a palatal glide comes after.

Examples

 /iɣəč/ pronounced [ɨɣəts ~ jɣəts] meaning '(s)he killed it'
 /iɣan/ pronounced [ɨɣan ~ jɣan] meaning '(s)he ate'

The letter /u/ 
When the /u/ is followed by another vowel, an optional rounded glide occurs between the two vowels.

Examples

 /dui/ pronounced [ⁿdui ~ ⁿduwi] meaning 'man'
 /nuo/ pronounced [nuo ~ nuwo] meaning 'water'
 /duen/ pronounced [ⁿduen ~ ⁿduwen] meaning 'with'

The letters /ue/ and /uo/ 
When using the combination of /ue/, one can substituted it for /uo/, but /uo/ cannot be substituted for /ue/.

Examples

 /duen/ pronounced [ⁿduen ~ ⁿduon] meaning 'with'
 /na:bues/ pronounced [na: ᵐbues ~ ᵐbuos] meaning 'New Guinea rosewood'
 /buok/ pronounced [ᵐbuok] meaning /water taro'
 /nuot/ pronounced [nuot] meaning 'tendon'

Schwa
Comparing the use of /i/ and /ə/

 /ičile/ meaning '(s)he washed it'
 /ičəle/ meaning 's(he) combed it'
 /ilŋiliŋ meaning '(s)he walked'
 /iləŋləŋ meaning '(s)he left it'

Comparing the use of /e/ and /ə/

 /ives/ meaning 'four'
 /ivəs/ meaning 'how many?'
 /isel/ meaning 'it floated'
 /isəl/ meaning '(s)he went fishing by torchlight'

Comparing the use of /a/ and /ə/

 /ilaɣ/ meaning '(s)he is married'
 /iləɣ/ meaning '(s)he tied it up'
 /nisaɣ/ meaning 'banana'
 /nisəɣ/ meaning 'kingfisher'

Comparing the use of /o/ and /ə/

 /ičpaɣ/ meaning '(s)he squatted'
 /čəpaɣ/ meaning 'earth oven'
 /noɣmo/ meaning 'slitgong'
 /nəɣmo/ meaning 'island teak'

Comparing the use of /u/ and /ə/

 /nuɣru/ meaning 'Christmas'
 /nəɣsen/ meaning 'his/her name'
 /isusur/ meaning '(s)he swore'
 /səsən/ meaning 'her breast'

Although schwa (/ə/) is a contrastive vowel among some languages, it is not a universal vowel in all the languages in the area. In the Tape language, schwa is very common and is in 16.5% of the lexicon. The schwa is a unique vowel because it cannot begin or end a word. It also cannot follow or come before another vowel, meaning that there must be simultaneously preceded and followed by a consonant.

Consonants 

There are many similarities as well as differences in the consonants available in the languages around the Tape area. For example, Tape does not contain any apicolabial consonants which is similar to the languages in the northeastern part of Malakua. Also the Tape language includes the contrastive palatal affricate, /č/, which is not present in V'ënen Taut, a language located near Tape. In addition, the Tape language contains a contrastive series of labiovelar consonants which the languages, V'ënen Taut, Larevat, and Naman lack.

Grammar

Nominalization
One is able to obtain a noun by adding a -ien to the a verb root.

Examples

 mekar meaning 'work'
 mekar-ien meaning 'work, job'
 mësit meaning 'sick'
 mësit-ien meaning 'illness, disease'
vërëng meaning 'think'
vërëng-ien meaning 'thought

By adding -ien to a verb ending in p, the p will usually change to a v.

Examples

 ngep meaning 'breathe
 ngev-ien meaning 'asthma'

One is able to obtain a noun By adding në- to a verb.

Examples

 jijër meaning 'sweep'
 në-jijër meaning 'broom'

Compounding
By combining two nouns together, one is able to form a new noun related to both words.

Adding a place after a noun indicates the noun is originating from that particular place.

Possession 
In many Oceanic languages, there is a distinction between indirect and direct possession of nouns. Indirect possession usually occurs when adding another phrase or word after the possessive noun while direct possession occurs when adding a prefix to the noun it is possessing.

Indirectly possessed nouns 
There are special markers indicating the different types of possession like using ese- for general possession. Besides the general possession, there is possession towards, eating, chewing, and drinking. By adding de-, jomo-, and mëne-, one is referring to eating, chewing, and drinking respectively.

Directly possessed nouns 

Example

 pëti-m (head - 2SG) meaning 'your head'

Numerals 

isimëk, isig
 iru
 itël
 ives
 ilëm
 lëmjis
 jiru
 jitël
 jevet
 isngel
isngel dëmon isimëk
isngel dëmon iru
isngel dëmon itël
isngel dëmon ives
isngel dëmon ilëm
isngel dëmon lëmjis
isngel dëmon jiru
isngel dëmon jitël
isngel dëmon jevet
ingelru
ingelru dëmon isig

When counting from 1-10, it is like counting in any other language where an arbitrary meaning is attached to a word. After counting to ten, one must add the word, isngel and dëmon before the numerals 1-9 to make teen numbers. The form, dëmon, has no meaning by itself in the Tape language.

References

External links 
 Paradisec has a number of collections that include Maragus language materials

Malekula languages
Languages of Vanuatu
Critically endangered languages